Hilary Scharper (born 1961) is a Canadian novelist and professor of cultural anthropology at the University of Toronto. Scharper's fiction, teaching and research focus on cultural approaches to nature. She writes historical fiction, multi-species fiction, and, self-coined, "ecoGothic" fiction.

Biography 
Born in 1961, Scharper grew up in Toronto, Ontario. She attended Yale, where she received her PhD in Anthropology in 1992.

Writing 


Scharper's first novel, Perdita (2013) is a gothic novel with strong nature themes. She has characterized her writing as "ecoGothic," a newly minted subgenre that represents a more ecologically aware gothic. Scharper has stated: "I do not treat nature as merely a backdrop or setting, but rather as an active and indeed central player in the narrative." Jennifer Dawson credits Scharper with originating the term "ecoGothic". Critic Robert Douglas has suggested that Scharper's fiction draws upon literary classics such as Emily Brontë's Wuthering Heights and Charlotte Brontë's Jane Eyre,  noting that all these novels feature landscapes that are "desolate," "powerful" and "cruel."

Scharper's book of short stories, Dream Dresses (2009), draws upon her experience as an ethnographer and explores women's experiences of dressing over the life cycle. Hollins Critic writes that Scharper "brings to her fiction writing a trained anthropological eye." The Toronto Star wrote that her writing in Dream Dresses was "reminiscent of Thomas Carlyle."

Selected works

Fiction
Dream Dresses: Stories (2009) 
Perdita (2013)  ,

References

External links
 Hilary Scharper 
 Hilary Scharper University of Toronto

1961 births
21st-century Canadian novelists
21st-century Canadian women writers
Canadian non-fiction writers
Canadian women novelists
Living people
Academic staff of the University of Toronto
Writers from Toronto
Writers of Gothic fiction
Yale University alumni
Canadian expatriates in the United States
Canadian women non-fiction writers